The 2018–19 Gardner–Webb Runnin' Bulldogs men's basketball team represented Gardner–Webb University during the 2018–19 NCAA Division I men's basketball season. The Runnin' Bulldogs, led by sixth-year head coach Tim Craft, played their home games at the Paul Porter Arena in Boiling Springs, North Carolina as members of the Big South Conference. They finished the season 23–12, 10–6 in Big South play to finish in a tie for third place. They defeated High Point, Campbell and Radford to be champions of the Big South tournament. They earned the Big South's automatic-bid to the NCAA tournament, their first NCAA Tournament bid in school history, where they lost in the first round to Virginia.

Previous season
The Runnin' Bulldogs  finished the 2017–18 season 14–18, 9–9 in Big South play to finish in a four-way tie for fifth place. As the No. 6 seed in the Big South tournament, they lost to Winthrop in the quarterfinals.

Roster

Schedule and results

|-
!colspan=9 style=| Non-conference regular season

|-
!colspan=9 style=| Big South regular season

|-
!colspan=9 style=| Big South tournament

|-
!colspan=9 style=| NCAA tournament

Despite both being members of the Big South, their meeting with USC Upstate on November 28 will be considered a non-conference game. The game was scheduled prior to USC Upstate joining the conference. Their meeting on January 12 will be a conference game.

References

Gardner–Webb Runnin' Bulldogs men's basketball seasons
Gardner-Webb
Gardner-Webb Runnin' Bulldogs men's basketball
Gardner-Webb Runnin' Bulldogs men's basketball
Gardner-Webb